Guido Elmi (7 September 1935 – 14 July 2018) was an Italian swimmer. He competed in the men's 4 × 200 metre freestyle relay at the 1956 Summer Olympics.

References

External links
 

1935 births
2018 deaths
Olympic swimmers of Italy
Swimmers at the 1956 Summer Olympics
Swimmers from Milan
Italian male freestyle swimmers
20th-century Italian people